Sharkansky may refer to:

Ira Sharkansky, Professor Emeritus of Political Science at the Hebrew University of Jerusalem
Sharkansky District, an administrative and municipal district in the Udmurt Republic, Russia